Antonio Forcione is an Italian jazz guitarist. He first toured Italy at age 13 in the 1970s. His 2000 album Live! was recorded at The Vortex in London. He also recorded a duet album with bassist Charlie Haden – Heartplay.

Discography
 Light & Shade with Eduardo Niebla (Sol, 1984)
 Eurotour with Eduardo Niebla (Sol, 1985)
 Celebration with Eduardo Niebla (Venture, 1987)
 Poema with Eduardo Niebla (Jazzpoint, 1992)
 Dedicato (Naim, 1996)
 Acoustic Revenge (Naim, 1997)
 Ghetto Paradise (Naim, 1998)
 Meet Me in London with Sabina Sciubba (Naim, 1998)
 Vento Del Sud with Benito Madonia (Naim, 2000)
 Live! (Naim, 2000)
 Touch Wood (Naim, 2003)
 Tears of Joy (Naim, 2005)
 Heartplay with Charlie Haden (Naim, 2006)
 In Concert (Naim, 2007)
 Sketches of Africa (Antastic, 2012)
 Compared to What with Sarah Jane Morris (Fallen Angel/Antastic, 2016)
 Joy with AKA Trio (Bendigedig, 2019)

References

External links
 
 YouTube channel

Year of birth missing (living people)
Living people
Italian jazz guitarists
Fingerstyle guitarists
Acoustic guitarists